= Paulina Harriet =

French-Spanish industrialist and philanthropist

Paulina Harriet de Gorostarzou (1811–1891) was a French-Spanish industrialist and philanthropist. She is known as the founder of the Colegio Nuestra Señora de Lourdes in Valladolid in 1884.

She married the textile merchant Juan Dibildos Barhó in 1840. The couple founded a tanning factory in Valladolid. When she was widowed in 1874, she took over the business personally.

She died 16 November 1891.
